is a Japanese anime television series produced by Ufotable and Aniplex and directed by Toshiyuki Shirai, with music composed by Hideyuki Fukasawa. It is based on the video game Touken Ranbu. The anime series aired between July 1 and September 23, 2017. An anime theatrical film project is currently in production.

Plot 
In the year 1863, Japan is split between the warring pro-shogunate and anti-shogunate factions. Joined by Tonbokiri, Yagen Toushirou, Mutsunokami Yoshiyuki, and Tsurumaru Kuninaga, the Second Unit fights to maintain the rightful course of time.

Characters

Media

Manga
A manga version of the anime was serialized in Shueisha's Jump Square magazine from July 4 to December 4, 2017. It was then serialized in Jump Square website from January 4, 2018 to April 4, 2019. Shueisha collected its chapters in five tankōbon volumes, published from November 2017 to August 2019.

Anime
The series aired from July 1 to September 23, 2017. Aniplex of America licensed the anime series on April 14, 2017. At the end of the final episode, an anime theatrical film project was announced.

References

External links
 Anime official website 
 Anime official website 
 

2017 anime television series debuts
Anime television series based on video games
Aniplex
Fiction set in 1863
Manga based on video games
Shōnen manga
Shueisha manga
Ufotable